Cele may refer to:

Places
 Qira County (or Cele County), Hotan Prefecture, Xinjiang, China
 Cele, Texas, USA
 Célé, river in the Cantal and Lot départements of southwestern France

Other
 Cele (name)
 -cele, as a suffix, refers to a tumor or hernia, such as meningocele of the meninges

See also
 Celer (disambiguation)
 Celes (disambiguation)
 Celebrity (disambiguation)
 Céilidh